Atahualpa Yupanqui (born Héctor Roberto Chavero Aramburu; 31 January 1908 – 23 May 1992) was an Argentine singer, songwriter, guitarist, and writer. He is considered the most important Argentine folk musician of the 20th century.

Biography
Yupanqui was born Héctor Roberto Chavero Aramburu in Pergamino (Buenos Aires Province), in the Argentine pampas, about 200 kilometers away from Buenos Aires. His father was a mestizo of Quechua and Basque origins, while his mother was born in the Basque country. His family moved to the Northwest city of Tucumán when he was nine. In a bow to two legendary Incan kings, he adopted the stage name Atahualpa Yupanqui, which became famous all around the world.

In his early years, Yupanqui traveled extensively through the northwest of Argentina and the Altiplano studying the indigenous culture. He became politically active and joined the Communist Party of Argentina. In 1931, he took part in the failed Kennedy brothers uprising against the de facto government of José Félix Uriburu and in support of deposed president Hipólito Yrigoyen. After the uprising was defeated, he was forced to seek refuge in Uruguay. He returned to Argentina in 1934.

In 1935, Yupanqui paid his first visit to Buenos Aires; his compositions were growing in popularity, and he was invited to perform on the radio. Shortly thereafter, he made the acquaintance of pianist Antonieta Paula Pepin Fitzpatrick, nicknamed "Nenette", who became his lifelong companion and musical collaborator under the pseudonym "Pablo Del Cerro".

Because of his Communist Party affiliation (which lasted until 1952), his work suffered from censorship during Juan Perón's presidency; he was detained and incarcerated several times. Between 1944 and 1949, he was exiled in Uruguay, where he performed from time to time. In 1944 he was hired by Samuel V. de León to perform in the city of Durazno in benefit of magister students of the city, who had been collecting money to fundraise the Misiones Socio Pedagógicas, in that country. In what was his first visit to the city, he composed "A orillas del Yí", and dedicated it to Julio Martínez Oyanguren. He left for Europe in 1949. Édith Piaf invited him to perform in Paris on 7 July 1950. He immediately signed a contract with Le Chant du Monde, the recording company that published his first LP in Europe, Minero Soy (I am a Miner). This record won first prize for Best Foreign Disc at the Charles Cros Academy, which included three hundred fifty participants from all continents in its International Folklore Contest He subsequently toured extensively throughout Europe.

In 1952, Yupanqui returned to Buenos Aires. He broke with the Communist Party, which made it easier for him to book radio performances. While with Nenette they constructed their house on Cerro Colorado (Córdoba).

Recognition of Yupanqui's ethnographic work became widespread during the 1960s, and nueva canción artists such as Facundo Cabral, Mercedes Sosa and Jorge Cafrune recorded his compositions and made him popular among the younger musicians, who referred to him as Don Ata.

Yupanqui alternated between houses in Buenos Aires and Cerro Colorado, Córdoba province. During 1963–1964, he toured Colombia, Japan, Morocco, Egypt, Israel, and Italy. In 1967, he toured Spain, and settled in Paris. He returned regularly to Argentina and appeared in Argentinísima II in 1973, but these visits became less frequent when the military dictatorship of Jorge Videla came to power in 1976.
In February 1968, Yupanqui was named a Knight of the Ordre des Arts et des Lettres of France by the Ministry of Culture of that country, in honor of 18 years work enriching the literature of the French nation. Some of his songs are included in the programs of Institutes and Schools where Castilian Literature is taught.

In 1985, the Konex Foundation from Argentina granted him the Diamond Konex Award, one of the most prestigious awards in Argentina, as the most important Popular Musician in the last decade in his country.

In 1989, an important cultural center of France, the University of Nanterre, asked Yupanqui to write the lyrics of a cantata to commemorate the Bicentennial of the French Revolution. The piece, entitled "The Sacred Word" (Parole sacrée), was released before high French authorities. It was not a recollection of historical facts but rather a tribute to all the oppressed peoples that freed themselves.
Yupanqui died in Nîmes, France in 1992 at the age of 84; his remains were cremated and dispersed on his beloved Colorado Hill on 8 June 1992.

Best-known songs
Yupanqui's best-known compositions include:

"Basta Ya"
"Los Hermanos"
"Viene clareando"
"El arriero"
"Zamba del grillo"
"La añera"
"La pobrecita"
"Milonga del peón de campo"
"Camino del indio"
"Chacarera de las piedras"
"Recuerdos del Portezuelo"
"El alazán"
"Indiecito dormido"
"El aromo"
"Le tengo rabia al silencio"
"Piedra y camino"
"Luna tucumana"
"Los Ejes De Mi Carreta"
"Sin caballo y en Montiel"
"Cachilo dormido"
"Tú que puedes vuélvete"
"Nada mas"
"Preguntitas sobre Dios"

Books
Piedra sola (1940)
Aires indios  (1943)
Cerro Bayo (1953)
Guitarra (1960)
El canto del viento (1965)
El payador perseguido (1972)
La Capataza (1992)

Albums
Hits Collection Yupanqui Atahualpa
Basta Ya 2006
 ¡Soy Libre! ¡Soy Bueno! (1968)

Tributes
On 31 January 2012, Google Doodle celebrated Atahualpa Yupanqui’s 104th Birthday.

References

External links

Profile of Atahualpa Yupanqui
Muchas Gracias Atahualpa. Educational and cultural project promoting the work of Don Atahualpa Yupanqui. The site contains videos, songs, poetry, books, testimonials and awards.
Quotes from his music.
Official site – Fundacion Atahualpa Yupanqui
Discography, books and other

1908 births
1992 deaths
Argentine people of Quechua descent
Argentine people of Basque descent
Argentine male guitarists
20th-century Argentine male singers
Argentine male singer-songwriters
Argentine male writers
People from Pergamino
Nueva canción musicians
20th-century guitarists
Argentine folk singers